Bristles is a video game written by Fernando Herrera for the Atari 8-bit family and published by the company he cofounded, First Star Software, in 1983. It was ported to the Commodore 64, ZX Spectrum, and Exidy's Max-A-Flex arcade system. In Bristles, the player uses ladders and elevators to move Peter the Painter through a cutaway view of a house to paint all the walls.

Gameplay

In Bristles, the player controls Peter the Painter with the goal of painting the walls of eight different houses within a time limit. To move between the different floors Peter can ride an elevator or climb a ladder. If he gets caught in an open elevator shaft, Peter is sent to the bottom of the building.

Dangerous objects that hinder Peter's task include "flying half pints" that knock him down and "dumb buckets" that steal Peter's brush. Later levels add "Brenda the Brat", who leaves handprints all over the freshly painted walls, and the "Bucket Chucker" who never stops chasing Peter. Brenda can be pacified with a candy cane and Bucket Chucker can be temporarily trapped in a paint mixer. 

The player starts with 10 brushes serving as lives and additional two brushes are added after finishing the paint job on every level.

Music

Bristles soundtrack uses arrangements of different pieces from Tchaikovsky's The Nutcracker Suite, Op. 71a. The main theme is II. Danses caractéristiques - a. Marche. When the player is knocked down, the game reacts with a IIc piece: Russian Dance. When Brenda is ruining freshly painted walls, piece IIe Chinese Dance is played.

Reception
In a review for Antic in 1984, George Adamson wrote: "The game's action is fast and furious. It doesn't get faster in higher levels, though. Instead, Bristles offers more novel challenges". Video Games magazine wrote, "As excellent and colorful as the visuals are, the melodies throughout this contest are the real show stoppers."

In a 1985 ANALOG Computing review of reduced price games, Andy Eddy cautioned, "Many users will find Bristles too difficult and demanding, as it's a very hard game to master."

Legacy
In 2004, an authorized modification of the Atari 8-bit computer version was released as an Atari 5200 cartridge.

References

External links
Bristles at Atari Mania
Review in Electronic Fun with Computers & Games
Review in Commodore User
Review in GAMES magazine

1983 video games
Arcade video games
Atari 8-bit family games
Commodore 64 games
First Star Software games
Multiplayer and single-player video games
Platform games
Video games developed in the United States
Works about painting
ZX Spectrum games